Eupithecia masculina is a moth in the family Geometridae. It is found in Taiwan and the Philippines.

References

Moths described in 1988
masculina
Moths of Asia